Sir Walter Dixon Borrowes, 4th Baronet (1691 – 9 June 1741) was an Irish politician.

He was the eldest son of Sir Kildare Borrowes, 3rd Baronet and his wife Elizabeth Dixon, daughter of Sir Richard Dixon and his wife Mary Eustace of Calverstown. He was educated at Trinity College, Dublin. In 1709, he succeeded his father as baronet. Borrowes represented Harristown in the Irish House of Commons between 1721 and 1727. Subsequently, he sat for Athy until his death in 1741.

On 18 March 1720, Borrowes married Mary Pottinger, daughter of Captain Edward Pottinger. They had three sons. Borrowes died at Calverstown, County Kildare, which had come to his mother as  the heiress of her nephew, Robert Dixon, and was succeeded in the baronetcy by his only surviving son Sir Kildare Borrowes, 5th Bt.

The family's surname is sometimes spelt Burrowes.

References

1691 births
1741 deaths
Baronets in the Baronetage of Ireland
Irish MPs 1715–1727
Irish MPs 1727–1760
Members of the Parliament of Ireland (pre-1801) for County Kildare constituencies
Alumni of Trinity College Dublin